Ian McCallum (born September 1965) is an English guitarist and songwriter.

Early life
He was born in Gosforth, Newcastle upon Tyne, England and supports Scottish football club Rangers.

Career
McCallum started writing and touring in the early 1980s. He plays guitar for Stiff Little Fingers, and is also a recording artist in his own right.

He is a fan of the English folk-rock band Lindisfarne, and played guitar for them on one occasion when Simon Cowe was unavailable. He also co-wrote, with Lindisfarne member Alan Hull, the band's single "We Can Make It".  Additionally, McCallum's album Take Me as I Am (1997) features a cover of the Lindisfarne song "Heroes" (from their album Dance Your Life Away (1986)) and a tribute to Hull "Song for Alan".

Discography

As McCallum
 Left Handed (1988)
 Big Bigg Market (1992)
 Take Me As I Am (1997)

With Stiff Little Fingers
 Hope Street (1999)
 Guitar and Drum (2004)
 No Going Back (2014)

See also

 List of people from Newcastle upon Tyne
 List of guitarists
 List of songwriters

References

External links
 

Date of birth missing (living people)
1965 births
Living people
20th-century English musicians
21st-century English musicians
20th-century English writers
21st-century English writers
20th-century British composers
21st-century British composers
English punk rock guitarists
English rock guitarists
Musicians from Newcastle upon Tyne
People from Kenton, London
Stiff Little Fingers members